Idelisa Bonnelly de Calventi (10 September 1931 – 3 July 2022) was a Dominican marine biologist who is considered the "mother of marine conservation in the Caribbean". She was the founder of the study of biology in the Dominican Republic, as well as the founder of the Institute of Marine Biology and the Dominican Foundation for Marine Research. She was instrumental in the creation of the first Humpback Whale Sanctuary of the North Atlantic and has won numerous awards, including induction into the UNEP's Global 500 Roll of Honour, UNESCO's Marie Curie Medal and the Order of Merit of Duarte, Sánchez and Mella. The BBC has called her one of the most important women scientists in Latin America.

Biography
Idelisa Bonnelly Peralta was born on 10 September 1931 in Santiago de los Caballeros, Dominican Republic. As she wanted to study marine biology and there were no schools teaching biology in the Dominican Republic, she pursued her university studies in New York. In 1953, she enrolled at Columbia University, graduating with a BS in marine biology in 1956. She went on to attain a master's degree from New York University in 1961. After completion of her schooling, Bonnelly began her first job at the New York Aquarium as a research assistant to Ross Nigrelli. 

In 1962, she returned to the Dominican Republic and began teaching at the Universidad Autónoma de Santo Domingo (UASD), founding the first institution for the study of biology in the country. In 1966, she founded the Institute of Marine Biology, which later became the Research Center of Marine Biology, at which she taught from 1967 to 1986 and then until 1992 served as the coordinator of graduate studies.

In 1974, Bonnelly founded the Academy of Sciences of the Dominican Republic and began publishing works which became widely influential for those managing and concerned with conservation of marine resources. For her contributions, she was awarded the Medal of Merit of Dominican Women in Science by the Government of the Dominican Republic (1986), the National Science Prize from the Academy of Sciences of the Dominican Republic (1987), and was inducted into the Global 500 Roll of Honour by the United Nations Environment Programme (UNEP) in 1987.

She became a Professor Meritorious at (UASD) in 1990 and in 1991 she created the Dominican Foundation for Marine Research (FUNDEMAR), an institution which coordinates the marine management plan, studies marine life and the coral reef, and manages the Marine Mammal Sanctuary. That same year, Bonnelly joined the Organization for Women in Science for the Developing World (OWSD) and served in the First General Assembly. She continued publishing and her works have been utilized for influencing marine and coastal Environmental Law. Bonnelly was made an academic laureate of the Academy of Sciences in 2007, received a National Ecology Award from the Fundación Corripio in 2008, and was awarded the Marie Curie Medal from UNESCO in 2009. 

In 2010, the Society for the Conservation of Biology of Victoria, British Columbia, Canada, honored her with a Distinguished Service Award in Biology and in 2011, the Government of the Dominican Republic granted her the Order of Merit of Duarte, Sánchez and Mella. In 2013, she was recognized by the BBC as one of the ten most important women scientists in Latin America.

Death
Idelisa Bonnelly died on 3 July 2022 at the age of 90.

Awards 
 1986 Medal of Merit for Women in Science, Government of the Dominican Republic
 1987 National Science Prize, Academy of Sciences of the Dominican Republic
 1987 Global 500 Roll of Honour, United Nations Environment Programme (UNEP)
 1990 Meritorious professor Autonomous University of Santo Domingo
 2007 Academic Laureate Academy of Sciences of the Dominican Republic
 2008 National Ecology Award, Fundación Corripio
 2009 Marie Curie Medal, UNESCO
 2010 Distinguished Service Award in Biology (SCB), Society for the Conservation of Biology, Victoria, Canada, 2010
 2011 Order of Merit of Duarte, Sánchez and Mella, Government of the Dominican Republic
≠

Partial list of publications

See also 
 Timeline of women in science

References

External links 
 Interview

1931 births
2022 deaths
20th-century biologists
20th-century women scientists
21st-century biologists
21st-century women scientists
Columbia University alumni
Dominican Republic biologists
Dominican Republic people of Corsican descent
Dominican Republic people of French descent
Dominican Republic people of Virgin Islands descent
Dominican Republic women scientists
New York University alumni
Order of Merit of Duarte, Sánchez and Mella
People from Santiago de los Caballeros
Academic staff of Universidad Autónoma de Santo Domingo
White Dominicans
Women biologists